Robin Christopher (born June 18, 1965) is an American actress. She is known for her role as Skye Chandler Quartermaine on the ABC soap operas All My Children, One Life to Live, and General Hospital.

Early life
Christopher was born in Revere, Massachusetts. She turned down a fine arts scholarship to Boston University to pursue an acting career. Until her acting career took off, she supported herself working as a model and appeared on Romance novel covers.

Career
Christopher is the only actor to have played the same character (Skye Chandler) as a regular cast member on all three of ABC's soap operas: All My Children (1987–91, 2000), One Life to Live (1999–2001) and General Hospital (2001–08, 2010–12). She earned two nominations for an Daytime Emmy Award for Outstanding Supporting Actress in a Drama Series in 2003 and 2005. Christopher portrayed Lorna Devon on Another World (1994–97).  In both roles, on two different networks, Christopher's biological mother was portrayed by soap opera star Linda Dano, who played Skye's mother, Rae Cummings, on All My Children, One Life to Live, Port Charles, and General Hospital, and Lorna's mother, Felicia Gallant, on Another World.

When Christopher began playing Skye Chandler, the character was known as Skye Patterson. Over the years, the character married, divorced, remarried, redivorced, and believed on two occasions to have discovered and grown closer to her biological family, the Chandlers on All My Children and Quartermaines on General Hospital, only to discover her biological origins to be far murkier than originally realized.

In accord with Skye's nomadic journey through the ABC soaps and ultimate independence, Robin Christopher has often been referred to by fans as the 'Greta Garbo of soap opera', evoking in her performance the glamour and emotional depth of Classical Hollywood cinema.

In 1993, Christopher guest starred in two episodes of Star Trek: Deep Space Nine'''s first season, "Duet" and "In the Hands of the Prophets", as the Bajoran engineer Neela.

Personal life
Christopher has been married to her former Another World'' co-star Matt Crane since 2000 and they have two children together.

Filmography

References

External links

1965 births
Living people
People from Revere, Massachusetts
Actresses from Massachusetts
American soap opera actresses
American television actresses
21st-century American women